The Journal of Clinical Interventional Radiology is a triannual open-access peer-reviewed medical journal covering all aspects of vascular and non-vascular interventional radiology. It is published by Thieme Medical Publishers on behalf of the Indian Society of Vascular and Interventional Radiology. It was established in 2017 and the editor-in-chief is Shyamkumar Nidugala Keshava (Christian Medical College Vellore).

Abstracting and indexing
The journal is abstracted and indexed in Embase and Scopus.

References

External links

Thieme academic journals
Triannual journals
English-language journals
Radiology and medical imaging journals
Publications established in 2017